"Dance" is a song by American heavy metal band Ratt. It is the first track off their 1986 album Dancing Undercover and the tenth track of their compilation album Ratt & Roll 81-91. It reached #59 on the Billboard Hot 100. The song was written by Stephen Pearcy, guitarists Robbin Crosby and Warren DeMartini, and album producer Beau Hill.

The single was featured in the Miami Vice Season 3 episode "Down for the Count" in 1987.

Music video
In the music video for the song, the band is invited to perform by the master of ceremonies (played by comedian and actor Dick Shawn) during a brief interlude at a rock music show at the famed Whisky a Go Go. Ratt is initially reluctant, but the band relents and performs.

Track listing
1. "Dance" - 4:17
2. "Take a Chance" - 4:00

Personnel
Stephen Pearcy- vocals
Warren DeMartini- co-lead guitar
Robbin Crosby- co-lead guitar
Juan Croucier- bass 
Bobby Blotzer- drums

Charts

References

See also
Ratt
Dancing Undercover

1986 singles
Ratt songs
Song recordings produced by Beau Hill
Songs written by Stephen Pearcy
Songs written by Robbin Crosby
Songs written by Warren DeMartini
Songs written by Beau Hill